Tylorida is a genus of long-jawed orb-weavers that was first described by Eugène Louis Simon in 1894.

Species
 it contains eight species, found in Oceania, Africa, and Asia:
Tylorida flava Sankaran, Malamel, Joseph & Sebastian, 2017 – India
Tylorida marmorea (Pocock, 1901) – India, China
Tylorida mengla Zhu, Song & Zhang, 2003 – China
Tylorida mornensis (Benoit, 1978) – Seychelles
Tylorida seriata Thorell, 1899 – West Africa, Cameroon
Tylorida striata (Thorell, 1877) (type) – Comoros, India, China, SE Asia to Australia (Queensland)
Tylorida tianlin Zhu, Song & Zhang, 2003 – China, Laos
Tylorida ventralis (Thorell, 1877) – India to Taiwan, Japan, New Guinea

In synonymy:
T. concretipalpis (Schmidt & Krause, 1993) = Tylorida striata (Thorell, 1877)
T. cylindrata (Wang, 1991) = Tylorida marmorea (Pocock, 1901)
T. magniventer Bösenberg & Strand, 1906 = Tylorida striata (Thorell, 1877)
T. nicobarensis (Tikader, 1977) = Tylorida striata (Thorell, 1877)
T. pondae (Tikader, 1970) = Tylorida ventralis (Thorell, 1877)
T. sataraensis Kulkarni, 2014 = Tylorida marmorea (Pocock, 1901)
T. sphenoida (Wang, 1991) = Tylorida ventralis (Thorell, 1877)
T. stellimicans (Simon, 1885) = Tylorida striata (Thorell, 1877)

See also
 List of Tetragnathidae species

References

Araneomorphae genera
Spiders of Africa
Spiders of Asia
Spiders of Australia
Tetragnathidae